Sayyid Sibghatullah Shah Al-Rashidi II (Sindhi: صبغت الله شاهه راشدي ), Pir Pagaro the sixth, was a spiritual leader of the Hur Movement during Sindh's war for its freedom. Hur (Arabic:  حر meaning "free", "not slave") is a Sufi Muslim community in the province of Sindh, Pakistan.

Soreh Badshah (شهيد سورهيه بادشاهه) (the Victorious King or the great king) was the title given him by his Followers. He was hanged by the Sind colonial government on 20 March 1943 in the Central Jail Hyderabad, Sindh. His burial place remains unknown, despite requests to the government from people living in Sindh.

Independence Movement 

According to Faqeer Ghulam Shah Laghari (Chowki Shahdadpur), the Hur movement began with Sibghtullah Shah Badshah I [1779-1831]. It reached its peak in the time of Sibghtullah Shah Shaheed Suraih Badshah when the Hurs became militarily opposed to colonial rule. Several were arrested and imprisoned in the Vasarpur district Ahmed Nagar.

Sibghatullah Shah I provided forces to Syed Ahmed Shaheed to fight against the Sikhs. Since that time these people have been called "Hurs" [free people]. The independence movement was started by Syed Sibghtullah Shah Shaheed Awal in 1246 [Hijri].

Pagaras' and their followers fought against the colonial government for 108 years, from 1843 to 1951.

In 1922, Sibghtullah Shah II (Soreh Badshah) became Pir Pagara at age 12. He believed that British officers' behaviour towards Hur Jamat and the Sindhi people was unreasonable. He resented their behaviour and started to publicly support Indian independence. He organised a campaign against the colonial government and encouraged others to do the same. As a result, martial law was imposed to control the Hur movement. Pir Sahib established Gring Bungalow as his general headquarters. He recruited and trained followers to continue an armed struggle. Their slogans were "homeland or death" and "freedom or death".

The "Lahore mail" railway train was derailed by Hurs on 16 May 1942. When Hurs attacked the army and police they raised the slogan of "Bhej Pagaara". In an effort to rush the Hurs, their center Gring Bungalow was bombarded and destroyed on 26 May 1943. Pir Soreh Badshah was arrested on 24 October 1941 and imprisoned in Seoni in India.

The Hurs intensified their activities against the colonial government by attacking police stations, government buildings and railway stations as well as telephone and irrigation systems to paralyse society and to pressure the colonial government to release their spiritual leader.

Dargah Sharif and the bungalow in Pir Jo Goth were destroyed in 1943.

In 1942 important leaders in Sindh Prant were arrested. Pir Sahib Pagara was brought from Seoni to Sindh in January 1943 and was detained in the central jail in Hyderabad. The Hurs established the Makhi forest as their base.

The colonial government then began bombing Gring Bungalow, Makhi Forest and Dargah Sharif. They arrested thousands of Hur followers along with their families and kept them imprisoned until 1952.

Jail employees told the writer Nasir Jamal that they had heard from the ancestors that Soreh Badshah was buried outside of Phasi Ghat (place of execution) in the central jail at Hyderabad, Sindh, Pakistan. Because they anticipated an extreme reaction by the Hur Mujahid. The colonial authorities did not disclose the place of burial, in order to prevent the site from become a memorial.

History of the Hur Movement 

During the period of colonial rule (according to Voice of Sureh by Lutaf Mangrio and Nadeem Wagan), Pir Pagaro declared his community "Hur" (free). The colonial government made efforts to suppress the movement, which resulted in an armed response from the Hurs. Ultimately the colonial government passed the Hurs Act, where all followers of the movement were declared criminals and army officers were allowed to shoot suspected members on sight.

The Hurs continued their campaign even after the hanging of Pir Sahib, right up to the time of Pakistan's independence.

Pir Pagaro Syed Sibghatullah Shah II was hanged on 20 March 1943 and the British left the South Asia four years later on 14 August 1947. After the end of British rule, Pir Pagaro's two sons, who were in British custody in [[England, were released and came back to lead their community. Sindh was a province in the newly independent Pakistan. The sons of Sibghatullah Shah Shaheed, Pir Syed Shah Mardan Shah Rashdi-II alias Pir Syed Sikandar Ali Shah Rashidi and Pir Syed Nadir Ali Shah Rashidi were brought to Pakistan in December 1951 after long negotiations. The elder son, Pir Syed Shah Mardan Shah-II became the new Pir Pagara on 22 February 1952.

See also 
 Soreh Badshah

References 

1910 births
1943 deaths
20th-century executions by British India
Executed revolutionaries
Rashidi, Sibghatullah Shah
People executed by British India by hanging
Religious leadership roles
Sindhi people
Prisoners and detainees of British India
Pagara family
Sindhi warriors